Sadakathullah Appa College is a minority general degree college located in Palayamkottai, Tirunelveli district, Tamil Nadu. It was established in the year 1971. The college is affiliated with Manonmaniam Sundaranar University. This college offers different courses in arts, commerce and science.

Departments

Arts
Tamil
Arabic
English
History
B.B.A

Science
Mathematics
Physics
Chemistry
Life sciences
Computer science
Information Technology
Nutrition and Dietetics
Microbiology
Psychology
Physical education

Commerce
Commerce 
Economics

Activities & Services
NCC
NSS
Sadakath Outreach Program (SOP)
Youth Red Cross
Red Ribbon Club
Friends of Police
Manitham

Accreditation
The college is recognized by the University Grants Commission (UGC).

NAAC Certificate of accreditation - 

Internal quality assurance cell (IQAC)

References

External links
 http://sadakath.ac.in/

Educational institutions established in 1971
1971 establishments in Tamil Nadu
Colleges affiliated to Manonmaniam Sundaranar University
Universities and colleges in Tirunelveli district